WFTY-DT (channel 67) is a television station licensed to Smithtown, New York, United States, serving Long Island as an affiliate of the True Crime Network. It is owned by TelevisaUnivision alongside Newark, New Jersey–licensed UniMás co-flagship WFUT-DT (channel 68), and Paterson, New Jersey–licensed Univision co-flagship WXTV-DT (channel 41), which WFTY simulcasts on its respective second and third digital subchannels. The stations share studios on Frank W. Burr Boulevard in Teaneck, New Jersey, while WFTY-DT's transmitter is located in Middle Island, New York.

WFTY's programming is simulcast to New York City and northern New Jersey on WFUT's second digital subchannel (68.2) from a transmitter (shared with WXTV) located at the Empire State Building in midtown Manhattan.

History
The station first signed on the air on November 18, 1973 as WSNL-TV, originally licensed to Patchogue, New York. The station was founded on the premise of there being over three million people living on Long Island who were underserved by local television news coverage; with all the network affiliates based in Manhattan, it was rare to see more than one or two news stories a day focusing on Long Island.

WSNL went on the air with two daily newscasts: a half-hour early evening broadcast and an hour-long newscast at 10 p.m., in addition to coverage of high school sports; it also carried some off-network reruns and first-run syndicated programming. One of the more noteworthy series among this batch was Phil Donahue, which had been in national syndication since 1970, but had not been available in the crucial New York City market since WPIX (channel 11) dropped the show in the fall of 1970. After the station's demise, Donahue would not find another outlet until WOR-TV (channel 9) acquired the local rights to the program in 1976, followed by WNBC (channel 4) in 1977. The station also carried games from the short-lived New York Stars of the World Football League in 1974.

The station also produced several locally produced programs, among these offerings were: Chef Nicola (a cooking show hosted by Nicola Zanghi); Home Handyman (a home repair show hosted by future Assemblyman David McDonough); Captain Ahab (a weekday children's show hosted by George McCaskey, as the Captain); Ahab and Friends (a three-and-a-half-hour weekend children's show similar to WNEW-TV's Wonderama; also hosted by McCaskey, which featured cartoons, puppets, games, contests, and other assorted entertainment for its young audience);  Mary Kelly's Puppet Party (another children's program); Long Island Tonight with Richard Hall (a variety show); and The Fairchilds of Long Island (a rare locally produced soap opera which featured local actors).

The news department of 18 people used the very earliest form of portable videotape equipment, which only ran off AC or inverters in cars, and not off batteries. This greatly restricted local video coverage to the length of a power cord. In that era, before satellites were used for television distribution, the station employed a courier who used a motorcycle nightly to race from Manhattan with a tape of national and international news stories for the late newscasts.

After a year of operation, inadequate revenue resulted in the cutback of its news programming to five-minute briefs that aired several times a day and the department shrunk to just a few employees before the station went bankrupt and signed off for the last time on June 13, 1975.

Return to air
WSNL returned to the air again four-and-a-half years later, on December 4, 1979, with a broadcast day running from 7:00 p.m. to midnight weeknights and 8 a.m. to 3 p.m. on weekends. The station ran some old movies, brokered programming, and religious shows. The following month on January 30, 1980, an electrical fire nearly destroyed the station's studios, forcing WSNL to shut down again, this time until July 1980.

Upon returning to the air, the station began running a mixed independent/subscription television format featuring programming from Wometco Home Theater. WSNL aired a morning movie from WHT between 11 a.m. and 1 p.m., then ran encoded color bars until 3:45 p.m., followed by unencoded color bars until sign on at 4 p.m. for four hours of commercial programming. This lineup consisted primarily of old movies, film fillers, public affairs shows, and a local newscast that was anchored by Karl Grossman and Joan May. At 8 p.m., WSNL ran WHT programming until sign-off, which was usually around 1:30 a.m. or later. On Saturdays, WSNL operated for four hours beginning at 1 p.m. (featuring old movies, public affairs shows and wrestling), followed by WHT programming from 5 p.m. until sign-off. Sunday was slightly different, as WSNL would sign on at 8 a.m. with two hours of religious shows, then sign off at 10 a.m., it resumed programming at 1 p.m. with general entertainment programming running until 5 p.m., followed by WHT programming running until sign-off. In late 1980, Wometco Enterprises bought WSNL and began simulcasting Newark's WWHT (now WFUT). However, WSNL would occasionally break away from WWHT-TV during its entertainment schedule to run a local public affairs show, then rejoin WWHT.

In a corporate deal, Kohlberg Kravis Roberts took over Wometco along with a couple of other broadcasting companies. In 1985, WSNL and WWHT discontinued general entertainment and subscription programming in favor of music videos, with the parent station becoming known as "U-68". By the fall of 1986, KKR sold its stations to a variety of owners, with WWHT and WSNL sold to the Home Shopping Network, WSNL-TV became WHSI and WWHT-TV became WHSE. HSN programming ran on both stations continuously for the next fifteen years.

In 1999, HSN's newly renamed broadcasting arm USA Broadcasting began switching stations to a new general entertainment independent format known as "CityVision" with WHSE/WHSI slated to become the 5th USAB station to convert to this format under "The Worx 68" branding with at least one of the two stations gaining WORX call letters. The process was far enough along that an imaging package similar to the other CityVision stations was completed and ready for launch. Before it could however, financial problems in late 2000 forced USA Broadcasting to stop all "CityVision" development and put the station group up for sale with Disney, owners of ABC and O&O WABC-TV, and Univision, owner of flagship WXTV, both bidding for the stations. Meantime, in the interim and as a cost cutting measure, WHSE/WHSI switched to programming from the AIN/UATV networks. Univision later outbid Disney and on January 14, 2002—along with all but three USAB stations—WHSE/WHSI became charter affiliates of Univision's new second network Telefutura (later rebranded as UniMás in 2013) with WHSE's call letters changing to WFUT and WHSI's changing to WFTY. In November 2017, UniMás moved to WFTY's 67.2 subchannel with the main 67.1 channel returning to English-language service as New York's Justice Network affiliate (which rebranded as the True Crime Network in 2020).

Technical information

Subchannels
The station's digital signal is multiplexed:

Analog-to-digital conversion
WFTY discontinued regular programming on its analog signal, over UHF channel 67, on June 12, 2009, as part of the federally mandated transition from analog to digital television. The station's digital signal remained on its pre-transition UHF channel 23, using PSIP to display WFTY's virtual channel as 67 on digital television receivers, which was among the high band UHF channels (52-69) that were removed from broadcasting use as a result of the transition.

See also
WFUT-DT

References

External links
UniMás
Univision
FCC History Cards for WFTY
YouTube WSNL-TV: A Remembrance

FTY-DT
Television channels and stations established in 1973
1973 establishments in New York (state)
True Crime Network affiliates
UniMás network affiliates
Univision network affiliates
Grit (TV network) affiliates
Ion Mystery affiliates
Wometco Enterprises
Mass media in Suffolk County, New York
Companies based in Bergen County, New Jersey